Magdiel Estrada (born August 26, 1994) is a Cuban judoka. He competed at the 2016 Summer Olympics in the men's 73 kg event, in which he was eliminated in the second round by Lasha Shavdatuashvili.

He represented Cuba at the 2020 Summer Olympics.

References

External links
 
 
 

1994 births
Living people
Cuban male judoka
Olympic judoka of Cuba
Judoka at the 2016 Summer Olympics
Pan American Games medalists in judo
Pan American Games gold medalists for Cuba
Judoka at the 2015 Pan American Games
Judoka at the 2019 Pan American Games
Medalists at the 2015 Pan American Games
Medalists at the 2019 Pan American Games
Judoka at the 2020 Summer Olympics
20th-century Cuban people
21st-century Cuban people